The Royal Terberg Group B.V. is a specialised vehicle manufacturer based in IJsselstein, Utrecht, Netherlands building special trucks and fitting specialist equipment to other manufacturer's trucks, cars and vans.

Customers operate terminals at ports, airports and logistic centres. Other specialised vehicles are supplied to the construction, mining and tunnelling industries. Terberg heavy-duty tractors and low-entry trucks are used by all sectors. Electric tractors are available.

Headquarters are in IJsselstein. Headquarters for Germany are in Hamburg with branches in Bochum and Bad Rappenau.

Terberg also makes waste collection systems and truck-mounted forklifts. In the Netherlands, Terberg provides financial services including leasing and rental arrangements for passenger cars and commercial vehicles.

Subsidiaries operate in the Netherlands, United Kingdom, Germany, Belgium, France, Spain and Poland as well as Malaysia and the United Arab Emirates and, in America, in Brazil and the United States.

Terberg began as blacksmiths, built carriages and after the Second World War renovated war-surplus trucks. Terberg built its first truck in 1966 using components from a variety of manufacturers. Ultimately Terberg standardised with Volvo components

Gallery

Terberg RosRoca Group
Terberg RosRoca Group, established in 2016, is managed from Warwick, England where Ros Roca's former subsidiary, Dennis Eagle, is located.  Terberg Group holds the controlling share of Terberg RosRoca.

Terberg RosRoca Group was formed by merging the Environmental division of Terberg Group and Ros Roca of Spain. The components retained their trading names.

When the merger was arranged Terberg RosRoca Group had 1,300 employees around the world and annual turnover of  €385 million. There were production plants in the UK, Netherlands, Spain, Germany, Brazil and China.

In March 2022, it was announced that the Terberg RosRoca group would revert to its previous trading name as the 'Terberg Environmental Group'.

See also

Other Netherlands truck manufacturers
 DAF Trucks
 GINAF

References

External links
 Group Official
 Terberg Special Vehicles
 Terberg Shunters
 

Truck manufacturers of the Netherlands
Waste collection vehicles
Vehicle manufacturing companies established in 1869
Dutch companies established in 1869